Frederick Baltimore Calvert (1793 – 21 April 1877) was an English actor and lecturer on elocution, the son of Charles Calvert, steward of the Duke of Norfolk.

Life
Calvert was born at Glossop Hall in Derbyshire and baptised on 11 April 1793. He entered Manchester Grammar School on 12 January 1804. Then he went to the Roman Catholic St. Edmund's College, Ware at Old Hall Green in Hertfordshire, with a view to receiving Holy Orders.

However, he took to the stage, and in the course of his career alternated leading parts with the elder Edmund Kean, William Charles Macready, and the elder George Vandenhoff. In 1824 he published 'A Defence of the Drama,' which had an extensive circulation, and was read by John Fawcett to the members of the Theatrical Fund at their annual dinner that year.

In 1829 he became elocutionary lecturer of King's College, University of Aberdeen and gave lectures on oratory, poetry, and other literary subjects in the large towns of Scotland and England. He later travelled to the United States, where he lectured on the English poets, and on returning from America gave evening discourses at the leading athenaeums on what he had seen during his American visit.

About 1846 he was appointed master of English language and literature at the Edinburgh Academy. In the winter of 1847–8 he gave readings of the English poets in connection with the Royal Society of Edinburgh. Some years after, he became lecturer on elocution to the Free Church colleges of Edinburgh and Glasgow.

He married, in 1818, Miss Percy of Whitby, with whom he had a large family. His youngest son, Michael Talbot Calvert, made a reputation as a tragic actor, under the stage name of Henry Talbot.

He died at his home, 2 West Newington, Edinburgh on 21 April 1877. He was a man of great literary refinement, and had an extensive knowledge of Greek and Roman literature, as well as of that of England and France.

Major works
 ' A Defence of the Acted Drama,' in a letter to T. Best, Hull, l 822.
 'Principles of Elocution,' by T. Ewing, thoroughly revised and greatly improved by F. B. Calvert, 1852 ; another edition, 1870.
 A Letter to the Very Rev. Dean Ramsay, Edinburgh, on ' The Art of Reading and Preaching distinctly,' 1869.
 'The De Oratore of Cicero,' translated by F.B. Calvert, M.A., 1870.
 ' An Ode to Shakespeare.'

The Calvert family
Frederick's father, Charles Calvert the elder, was born in 1754 and died on 13 June 1797; he is buried in St. Mary's churchyard, Manchester. Charles the elder would live in Oldham Street, Manchester during the winter and at Glossop Hall in the summer. Frederick's father's brother, Raisley Calvert, who died in 1794, was a sculptor, and is well known as the friend and admirer of William Wordsworth, to whom he bequeathed 900 pounds. Raisley had been to Cambridge University with Wordsworth and he looked after Raisley on his deathbed as he died of consumption. Other sons of Charles Calvert the elder and Frederick's uncles were Charles Calvert, Henry Calvert and Michael Pease Calvert, who were all painters. Michael was the youngest of nine children and was born on 15 March 1798 in Derbyshire, nine months after his father's death.
"Calvert! It must not be unheard by them
Who may respect my name, that I to thee
Owed many years of early liberty.
This care was thine when sickness did condemn
Thy youth to hopeless wasting, root and stem."
- William Wordsworth - referring to Raisley Calvert

References

1793 births
1877 deaths
English male stage actors
People from Glossop
Academics of the University of Aberdeen
19th-century English male actors
Schoolteachers from Derbyshire
People associated with Edinburgh